Paranormal Activity: Next of Kin is a 2021 American found footage supernatural horror film directed by William Eubank, written by Christopher Landon, and produced by Jason Blum and Oren Peli. Serving as the seventh installment of the Paranormal Activity series, the film stars Emily Bader, Roland Buck III, Dan Lippert, Henry Ayres-Brown, and Tom Nowicki, and follows a group who attempt to make a documentary on an Amish community, only for them to discover the horrific secrets the town holds.

Although Paranormal Activity: The Ghost Dimension was promoted as the final installment in the original series, Paramount Pictures announced in June 2019 that a seventh installment and stand-alone sequel was in development, with Blum and franchise creator Peli returning as producers. Landon was hired to write the script in early 2020, with Eubank set to direct in February 2021. Principal photography was wrapped by July 2021.

Paranormal Activity: Next of Kin was released in the United States on Paramount+ on October 29, 2021.

Plot
Margot and her cameraman friend Chris want to make a documentary about Margot's past. Her mother, Sarah, abandoned her outside a hospital, and she wonders what drove Sarah to make such a drastic decision. Through a genetics site, she and Chris meet her blood relative Samuel, who is an Amish currently going through his rumspringa. After the three fly to Buffalo, NY, they are joined by Dale, their documentary's soundman. Samuel leads them to Beiler Farm, where he and Margot's mother came from.

Jacob, the patriarch of the commune and Sarah's father, welcomes the team, and they find lodging in a rustic room. Late at night, Margot wakes up and discovers red lights moving in the distance; Samuel dismisses it as a hunting party. Margot visits the barn and finds a little girl brushing her doll's hair. The doll is named Sarah, and when Margot tells the girl that that was her mother's name, the girl cryptically says that Sarah is "still there." Come night time, Margot hears sounds from her mother's old room in the attic and sees a spirit.

The next morning, they interview Jacob on camera. He tells them about the free-spirited Sarah, who defied their practices by sleeping with a boy from the neighboring village and getting pregnant. Instead of following custom by being forced to give up Margot to an adoptive family, she instead left her at a hospital, and Sarah is now assumed dead. Through drone footage, Margot's team later finds a church which holds a warning to stay away, and Jacob quickly arrives to prevent them from entering. That night, Margot and the team discover a strange ritual in the barn in which a newborn two-headed goat is sacrificed.

Determined to find out the commune's secrets, Margot and Chris break into the church while Dale distracts Samuel. They discover paintings on the floor depicting the demonic figure Asmodeus, as well as a deep pit which Margot descends into before retreating when she hears a strange noise. Margot sneaks into Jacob's room the next day and finds his computer, where she discovers that he and Samuel had known about her being Sarah's daughter and orchestrated her arrival. She becomes upset and Chris suggests that they leave, but a shadow-like ghoulish being attacks Margot that night. The next day, Chris and Dale find a catatonic Margot with her sheets soaked with blood; despite assurance from the local doctor, the two become suspicious.

Chris and Dale hitch a ride into town with the mailman to get a new car battery, and are informed by the mailman that the people at Beiler Farm are not Amish. Using the internet, the two discover that Beiler Farm is a community of demon worshippers. According to myth, the Norwegian village of Beskytter suffered a massacre believed to be caused by Asmodeus. They trapped the demon inside the body of a woman, and the demon continues to be passed from mother to daughter in the bloodline. Chris and Dale realize that Margot is next in line and this is why she was brought to the settlement.

When Chris and Dale return from their trip to the store, Margot has disappeared. While Dale leaves to install the battery, Chris enters the church to search for Margot. After encountering and killing Jacob, Chris finds Margot at the bottom of the pit and rescues her, but they are pursued by a skeletal creature as they flee the church. The creature kills Dale and pursues Margot and Chris in the barn, but Margot, realizing that the creature is Sarah possessed by Asmodeus, calls her by her name, which causes the creature to relent. Taking advantage of her mother's weakened state, Margot then pushes Sarah, sending her falling to her death onto a spiked row of farm tools.

With the death of Sarah, Asmodeus wreaks havoc in Beiler Farm, with the residents killing each other and the livestock and the homes burning. Margot and Chris retrieve the car keys from Dale's body and flee the farm. Later, police officers arrive on the scene and are attracted to a child's crying in the barn. Upon investigating, they realize the noises are caused by the demonically-possessed Samuel. Using his demonic possession, Samuel forces the police officers to die by suicide before driving away in a police cruiser, presumably going after Margot and Chris.

Cast

 Emily Bader as Margot
 Roland Buck III as Chris
 Dan Lippert as Dale
 Henry Ayres-Brown as Samuel Beiler
 Tom Nowicki as Jacob Beiler
 Kyli Zion and Kirby Johnson as the creature

Production
On June 19, 2019, Paramount Pictures announced that a seventh installment of the film series was in development, with Jason Blum and franchise creator Oren Peli. In February 2020, Blum revealed that Christopher Landon was writing the script. On February 12, 2021, it was announced that William Eubank was attached to direct the film, with the film also confirmed to be a reboot rather than a continuation of the previous films. On February 14, 2021, the film was announced to be in production with The In Between and an untitled Pet Sematary film for Paramount+. In March 2021, Emily Bader, Roland Buck III, Dan Lippert, and Henry Ayres-Brown were cast in undisclosed roles. By October 2021, Tom Nowicki was revealed as part of the cast.

Principal photography concluded in July 2021. In September 2021, the film's title was officially revealed to be Paranormal Activity: Next of Kin.

Release
Paranormal Activity: Next of Kin was released in the United States on Paramount+ on October 29, 2021. The film was originally set for a theatrical release on March 19, 2021, but was delayed to March 4, 2022, due to the COVID-19 pandemic. Instead of the theatrical release, the film was released exclusively on Paramount+. ViacomCBS CEO Robert Bakish said the film would premiere before the end of 2021. The film's release was officially moved up to October 29, 2021.

Critical response
On Rotten Tomatoes, the film has an approval rating of 30% based on 46 reviews from critics and an average rating of 4.80/10. The website's critical consensus reads: "Paranormal Activity: Next of Kin gives the long-running found-footage franchise a new level of visual polish; unfortunately, effective scares are few and far between". On Metacritic, the film has a score of 37 out of 100 based on reviews from 13 critics, indicating "generally unfavorable reviews".

References

External links
 
 

2020s English-language films
2020s supernatural horror films
2021 films
2021 horror films
2021 psychological thriller films
American psychological thriller films
American supernatural horror films
Folk horror films
Amish in films
Films directed by William Eubank
Films not released in theaters due to the COVID-19 pandemic
Films postponed due to the COVID-19 pandemic
Films produced by Jason Blum
Paramount+ original films
Paramount Pictures films
Paramount Players films
Blumhouse Productions films
Paranormal Activity (film series)
Reboot films
2020s American films
Found footage films